Urbain Caffi (10 January 1917 – 16 March 1991) was an Italian-born French racing cyclist. He won the French national road race title in 1944. He also rode in the 1947 and 1948 Tour de France.

References

External links
 

1917 births
1991 deaths
French male cyclists
Cyclists from the Metropolitan City of Milan
Italian emigrants to France